Zouaoui or Zawawi may refer to:

People 
Ahmed Zouaoui, a maliki mufti and faqih
Ali Zouaoui, an economist and politician
Anis Zouaoui, a handballer
Ibn Muti al-Zawawi, a hanafi faqih
Mohamed Zouaoui, an actor
Muhamad Zawawi Azman, a racing cyclist
Nagwan El-Zawawi, a weightlifter
Nik Muhammad Zawawi Salleh, a politician
Phahrolrazi Zawawi, a politician
Qais Bin Abdul Munim Al Zawawi, a politician
Vincent Zouaoui-Dandrieux, a long-distance runner
Wan Zawawi, a footballer
Youssef Zouaoui, a footballer
Zawawi Mughni, a politician

See also
Zawawi Mosque, a mosque
Ali Zouaoui Stadium, a stadium
Zawawi Cup, a horse race